The Northamptonshire Combination Football League is a football competition based in England. It has a total of five divisions with many reserve teams competing in the bottom three. The most senior league is the Premier Division, which sits at step 7 (or level 11) of the National League System.

Recent divisional champions 
Since season 1991–92, divisional champions have been as follow:

Current structure

Sitting at Step 7 of the National League system, the Northamptonshire Combination has a promotion and relegation agreement with the United Counties League. Promotion is dependent solely upon a team making an application to the UCL and meeting the requirements to do so. Rushden Rangers are the latest team to do so, following their merger with Higham Town at the end of the 2006–07 season. Other teams to have made the journey upwards include Burton Park Wanderers, Harborough Town and Woodford United, all playing in the United Counties League. Clubs in the Northamptonshire area wishing to resign from the United Counties League will be placed in this competition. The league also accommodates Reserve sides from higher level teams in the Reserve Divisions. Bugbrooke St Michaels are the best known example, with an 'A' and 'B' side involved in the competition, in addition to their first and reserve teams.

2022–23 members

Premier Division
 AFC Rushden & Diamonds U23 Academy
 Blisworth
 Corby Pegasus
 Corby Stewart & Lloyds
 Corby Strip Mills
 Corby White Hart Locos
 Earls Barton United
 Harpole
 Heyford Athletic
 Irchester United
 Kettering Nomads
 Roade
 Rothwell Aztec
 Spratton
 Wollaston Victoria
 Woodford United

Division One
 AFC Towcester
 Bugbrooke St Michael 'A'
 Corby Siam
 Earls Barton United Reserves
 Finedon Volta
 Higham Town
 Medbourne
 Milton
 Moulton Reserves
 Northampton O.N. Chenecks 'A'
 Thrapston Venturas
 West Haddon Albion
 Wollaston Victoria Reserves
 Wootton St George

Division Two
 Brixworth All Saints
 Bugbrooke St Michael 'B'
 Corby Kingswood
 Crick Athletic
 Harpole Reserves
 Heyford Athletic Reserves
 Irchester United Reserves
 Kettering
 Kettering Nomads Reserves
 Roade Reserves
 Stanwick Rovers
 Weldon United
 Wellingborough Whitworth 'A'

Division Three
 AFC Woodford
 Burton Park Wanderers Reserves
 Corby Rovers
 Corby Siam Reserves
 Corby Stewart & Lloyds Reserves
 Corby White Hart Locos Reserves
 Daventry Town Hobbs
 Finedon Volta Reserves
 Great Doddington
 Higham Town Reserves
 Kettering Ise Lodge
 Kettering Orchard Park
 Kingsthorpe Jets
 Rothwell Aztec Reserves
 Wellingborough Old Grammarians
 Woodford United Reserves

Division Four
 Blisworth Development
 Corby Trades
 Crick Athletic Reserves
 Harpole 'A'
 Milton Reserves
 Northants Eagles
 Spratton Reserves
 Stanwick Rovers Reserves
 Thorplands Club 81
 Thrapston Venturas Reserves
 Weedon
 Weldon United Reserves
 Welford Victoria Colts
 Wellingborough Gleneagles
 Wellingborough Old Grammarians Reserves
 West Haddon Albion Reserves

References

External links
 Official website

 
Football leagues in England
Football in Northamptonshire